Manuel Battistini (born 22 July 1994) is a Sammarinese footballer who currently plays for Juvenes/Dogana as a midfielder.

He has been capped by the San Marino national football team making his international debut on 11 October 2013, in a 2014 FIFA World Cup qualifier against Moldova when he came in for Maicol Berretti.

References

External links
 

1994 births
Living people
Sammarinese footballers
San Marino international footballers
Association football midfielders
Campionato Sammarinese di Calcio players